In cinematography, butterflies (also known as overheads) are structures on which materials are mounted so to control lighting in a scene or photograph. Materials commonly used on butterflies include: flags (black, opaque materials), nets (layers of neutral-colored bobinette), and diffusions  (translucent white materials of different densities) for the purposes of blocking, dimming, and scattering light respectively. In general, butterflies are used only for very large materials (6 ft x 6 ft or greater), while smaller sizes are usually sewn onto portable frames (similar in construction to picture frames) for ease of placement and storage.

Use in Industry
In industry, butterflies are often called for by their dimensions, which are standard: 6 ft. x 6 ft, 8x8, 12x12, and 20x20. The materials themselves tend to be created at smaller sizes—usually about 8 inches less in each dimension—so as order to ensure a flat, stretched surface when mounted on the butterfly. 

While portable frames usually consist of light-blocking and scattering materials (flags, nets, and diffusions), butterflies may also be rigged with reflective materials such as silver lame for redirecting light.

Film and video terminology